Buck Township is one of the fifteen townships of Hardin County, Ohio, United States. As of the 2010 census the population was 2,449, of whom 1,070 lived in the unincorporated portion of the township.

Geography
Located in the southern center of the county, it borders the following townships:
Pleasant Township - north
Dudley Township - east
Hale Township - southeast
Taylor Creek Township - southwest
Lynn Township - west
Cessna Township - northwest

Part of the city of Kenton, the county seat of Hardin County, is located in northern Buck Township.

Name and history
Buck Township most likely was organized in 1845. This township derives its name from Harvey Buckminster, a pioneer settler. It is the only Buck Township statewide, although there is a Bucks Township in Tuscarawas County.

Government
The township is governed by a three-member board of trustees, who are elected in November of odd-numbered years to a four-year term beginning on the following January 1. Two are elected in the year after the presidential election and one is elected in the year before it. There is also an elected township fiscal officer, who serves a four-year term beginning on April 1 of the year after the election, which is held in November of the year before the presidential election. Vacancies in the fiscal officership or on the board of trustees are filled by the remaining trustees.

References

External links
County website

Townships in Hardin County, Ohio
1845 establishments in Ohio
Populated places established in 1845
Townships in Ohio